New York State Route 405 (NY 405) was a state highway in Rensselaer County, New York, in the United States. In between, NY 405 intersected NY 136. The entirety of NY 405 was originally part of NY 40. In the February–March 1973, NY 40 was truncated northward to NY 7 in northern Troy and its former routing from US 4 to NY 66 was assigned NY 405. Ownership and maintenance of most of NY 405 was transferred to Rensselaer County on April 1, 1980, at which time the parts of the route given to the county were redesignated as part of County Route 74 (CR 74).

Route description
NY 405 began at an intersection with U.S. Route 4 in North Greenbush. It headed eastward and northeastward on Winter Street through a residential area to an intersection with NY 136. At the time, the intersection was the western terminus of NY 136. NY 405 continued northeastward into the city of Troy, where it ended at a junction with NY 66 in the extreme southeastern corner of the city.

History
NY 40 initially extended south of Troy to East Greenbush when it was assigned as part of the 1930 renumbering of state highways in New York. All of NY 40 from 125th Street in Troy southward was concurrent to U.S. Route 4. By 1932, NY 40 was rerouted south of Troy to leave US 4 at Winter Street and follow the street through North Greenbush and into Troy. At the end of Winter Street, NY 40 turned northwest, overlapping NY 66 into downtown Troy. The overlap between US 4 and NY 40 from East Greenbush to North Greenbush was eliminated in the late 1950s when NY 40 was truncated northward to the junction of US 4 and Winter Street. NY 40 originally overlapped with NY 7 through northern Troy and NY 66 out of the city. As part of numerous changes by the New York State Department of Transportation (NYSDOT) in February–March 1973, a new alignment would have NY 40 run down Oakwood Avenue to Hoosick Street in Troy, ending there. In response, a new route was created on the former alignment along Winter Street, designated as NY 405.

On April 1, 1980, ownership and maintenance of NY 405 from US 4 through its junction with NY 136 to the Troy city line was transferred from the state of New York to Rensselaer County as part of a highway maintenance swap between the two levels of government. The portions of NY 405 transferred to the county were redesignated as part of CR 74 while Williams Road became part of a westward extension of NY 136. Maintenance of Winter Street in the city of Troy remained the responsibility of the city of Troy, as it had been during NY 405's existence.

Major intersections

See also

List of county routes in Rensselaer County, New York

References

External links

405
Transportation in Rensselaer County, New York